Rescue Nunatak is a nunatak 14 miles south-southeast of Mount Martyn in southern Lazarev Mountains. The feature lies along the west side of upper Matusevich Glacier. Plotted by ANARE (Australian National Antarctic Research Expeditions) from photos taken by U.S. Navy Operation Highjump (1946–47) and ANARE (1959). Visited by New Zealand Geological Survey Antarctic Expedition (NZGSAE) (1963–64) who gave the name because of the rescue, in bitter conditions, of a sledge and dogs which had fallen into a nearby crevasse.
 

Nunataks of Oates Land